Greatest Hits, Volume One is the first of two greatest hits albums released on the same day in 1992 by country music artist Randy Travis. Two new songs were recorded for this album and released as singles. "If I Didn't Have You" reached number 1 on the Billboard Hot Country Songs chart while "An Old Pair of Shoes" reached #21. Although not a single, also included is "Reasons I Cheat" from Travis' 1986 debut album Storms of Life. This album has been certified platinum by the RIAA.

Track listing

Chart performance

Albums produced by Kyle Lehning
1992 greatest hits albums
Warner Records compilation albums
Randy Travis compilation albums